Camillo Rapetti (1859, Milan – 1929) was an Italian painter.

Biography
Rapetti attended the School of Decorative and Figural Art at the Brera Academy in Milan where he made his debut by winning the Fumagalli Prize with a portrait commissioned by Vittore Grubicy. He travelled to Rome, Paris and London developing the techniques of oil painting, watercolour and engraving. He received important commissions for decorative work in Milan where he frescoed civic buildings like the Teatro Eden and religious edifices like the church of the Ospedale Maggiore, he also executed some portraits of benefactors for the same institution. He showed genre scenes at the Turin Quadriennale in 1902 and at the Mostra Nazionale of Fine Arts in Milan in 1906. In 1926 he participated in the first exhibition of Milanese artists organized by the Famiglia Meneghina.

He taught at the Brera Academy.

References
 Laura Casone, Camillo Rapetti, online catalogue Artgate by Fondazione Cariplo, 2010, CC BY-SA (source for the first revision of this article).

Other projects

19th-century Italian painters
Italian male painters
20th-century Italian painters
Brera Academy alumni
Academic staff of Brera Academy
Painters from Milan
Italian genre painters
1859 births
1929 deaths
19th-century Italian male artists
20th-century Italian male artists